Camp Rock (Original Motion Picture Soundtrack) is the soundtrack album from the 2008 Disney Channel television film of the same name. It features lead vocals from American singers Demi Lovato, Joe, Kevin, Nick Jonas (Jonas Brothers), Roshon Fegan, Renee Sandstrom, Meaghan Martin, and Canadian singers Jordan Francis and Aaryn Doyle. The album was released on June 17, 2008, by Walt Disney Records. Full songs of the album were made available on Camp Rocks official web site for one week beginning on June 10, and the full soundtrack premiered on Radio Disney on June 14, during Planet Premiere: Camp Rock. The soundtrack was released in the United Kingdom one month later on July 14.

Camp Rock reached the top ten in six countries, among which peaked at number 3 on the US Billboard 200. It also topped the Soundtracks chart for four weeks. By September 2009, the Recording Industry Association of America (RIAA) certified the album platinum, after selling over a million copies in the country.

"We Rock" was the lead single from the soundtrack, released on April 19, 2008. It was followed by four other singles that were released for the promotion of the movie between May and June, which were: "Play My Music", "This Is Me", and "Gotta Find You".

Background 
The soundtrack album (both original and two-disc collector's edition) is an enhanced CD which contains a clip of an acoustic version of "This Is Me" when played on the computer with internet access. On November 16, 2008, a karaoke/instrumental version of the Camp Rock soundtrack was released.

Commercial performance 
Camp Rock (Original Motion Picture Soundtrack) debuted and peaked at number three on the US Billboard 200 with 188,000 copies sold in its first week. It stayed in the top ten for ten weeks, selling around 100,000 copies each. Two months after release, on September 9, the Recording Industry Association of America (RIAA) certified the soundtrack Gold and Platinum, after selling over 1,000,000 copies in the country.

Track listing

Charts

Weekly charts

Year-end charts

Certifications and sales

Footnotes

References

External links 
 Official Camp Rock Site

Albums produced by Greg Wells
Albums produced by Matthew Gerrard
Disney film soundtracks
2008 soundtrack albums
Television soundtracks
Walt Disney Records soundtracks
Soundtrack 1
Cast recordings